Nightcap is a Canadian musical variety television series which aired on CBC Television from 1953 to 1954.

Premise
The set of this Montreal-produced series resembled a cabaret club in which host Alan Mills would introduce guest performers. Series regulars included Nina Dova (vocals), Gilberto Assais (piano) and William Robert Fournier who portrayed the club's waiter.

Scheduling
This half-hour series was broadcast during the 1953–1954 season as follows:

External links
 
 

1953 Canadian television series debuts
1954 Canadian television series endings
1950s Canadian variety television series
Black-and-white Canadian television shows
CBC Television original programming
Television shows filmed in Montreal